Aphaenops loubensi is a species of beetle in the subfamily Trechinae. It was described by Jeannel in 1953.

References

loubensi
Beetles described in 1953